The Danish Gold Coast was established on the eastern Gold Coast (present-day Ghana):
Fort Friedensborg (Ningo)
 Fort Christiansborg
 Fort Augustaborg (Tshi)
 Fort Prinzenstein (Keta)
 Fort Konigenstein (Ada).

(Dates in italics indicate de facto continuation of office)

References

See also 
Colonial Heads of Ghana (Gold Coast)
Colonial Heads of Brandenburger Gold Coast
Colonial Heads of Dutch Gold Coast
Colonial Heads of Portuguese Gold Coast
Colonial Heads of Prussian Gold Coast
Colonial Heads of Swedish Gold Coast
Brandenburger Gold Coast
British Gold Coast
Danish Gold Coast
Dutch Gold Coast
Portuguese Gold Coast
Prussian Gold Coast
Swedish Gold Coast
Ghana
Heads of State of Ghana
Heads of Government of Ghana

 
Danish Gold Coast, Governors
Danish Gold Coast, Governors
Colonial governors of the Danish Gold Coast